192 (one hundred [and] ninety-two) is the natural number following 191 and preceding 193.

In mathematics
192 has the prime factorization . Because it has so many small prime factors, it is the smallest number with 14 divisors, namely 1, 2, 3, 4, 6, 8, 12, 16, 24, 32, 48, 64, 96, and 192 itself. Because its only prime factors are 2 and 3, it is a 3-smooth number.

192 is the sum of ten consecutive primes (5 + 7 + 11 + 13 + 17 + 19 + 23 + 29 + 31 + 37).

192 is a Leyland number of the second kind.

See also
 192 (disambiguation)

References

Integers